Marcin Wolski (born 22 July 1947 in Łódź) is a Polish writer, journalist and satirist. 

Member of the communist PZPR party from 1975 to 1981.

As a journalist, he writes for Wprost, Gazeta Polska and Tygodnik Solidarność. Many of his novels mix elements of science fiction, fantasy and political fiction and he was nominated for the Janusz A. Zajdel Award 3 times.

References

1947 births
Living people
Polish satirists
Polish male writers
Polish science fiction writers
Polish United Workers' Party members